Alajos Gáspár (1848 – September 22, 1919) was a Hungarian Slovene writer.

He was born in Alsószölnök. In 1884 he translated the book Sybil (titled Sibilinszka Kniga ali Proroküvanye od Kralicze Mihalde od Sabe, XIII. Sibila. Szpiszana szo z nemskoga na szlovenszki jezik obrnjena od Gáspár Alajosa na Gorényem sziniku. Doli szpiszano 1884. leta. Szabolin Lujzi; manuscript held by the University of Ljubljana Library) from German into Prekmurje Slovene.

See also 
 List of Slovene writers and poets in Hungary
 Sibyl

Literature 
 Marija Kozar & Kozár Mária. +Etnološki Slovar Slovencev na Madžarskem / A Magyarországi Szlovének Néprajzi Szótára, Monošter-Szombathely 1996. 

Slovenian writers and poets in Hungary
1848 births
1919 deaths